Natalya Igorevna Kutyakova (born  February 17, 1986) is a Russian triple jumper.

Achievements

External links 

1986 births
Living people
Russian female triple jumpers
Universiade medalists in athletics (track and field)
Universiade silver medalists for Russia
Medalists at the 2009 Summer Universiade